Tromatic Reflexxions is the debut album by Von Südenfed. It was released on 21 May 2007 and entered the UK charts at #124. The project is a further collaboration between German electronica outfit Mouse on Mars and Mark E. Smith of UK band The Fall. (Smith had previously provided guest vocals on a Mouse on Mars single in 2005). It includes the singles "Fledermaus Can't Get It" and "Rhinohead".

Track listing
 "Fledermaus Can't Get It" – 3:56
 "Rhinohead" – 4:16
 "Flooded" – 4:46
 "Family Feud" – 4:28
 "Serious Brainskin" – 3:51
 "Speech Contamination/German Fear of Osterreich" – 3:59
 "Young the Faceless and the Codes" – 4:31
 "Duckrog" – 2:47
 "Chicken Yiamas" – 2:36
 "That Sound Wiped" – 6:04
 "Jbak Lois Lane" – 2:56
 "Dearest Friends" – 4:43

References

2007 albums
Von Südenfed albums
Domino Recording Company albums